Hunger's Teeth is a 1994 studio album by the American avant-rock group 5uu's. It was the first album by the band since they reformed in 1994 and featured the new line-up of Dave Kerman, Sanjay Kumar and Bob Drake.

The album also featured four guest musicians, including Susanne Lewis from Thinking Plague and Hail, and Thomas Dimuzio, who was the solo performer on the track "Mangate".

Track listing
"Well... Not Chickenshit" (Kerman) – 6:35
"Roan" (Kerman) – 3:03
"Mangate" (Dimuzio) – 2:55
"Geronimo" (Kerman, Kumar) – 4:51
"Glue" (Kerman) – 2:41
"Opportunity Bangs" (Kerman, Kumar) – 5:18
"The Shears" (Drake, Kerman) – 1:25
"Bachelor Needle" (Kerman) – 2:16
"Truth, Justice, and the American Way" (Kerman, Kumar) – 5:35
"Equus" (Kerman) – 5:06
"Traveler Waits for No One" (Kerman) – 3:27

Personnel
Dave Kerman – drums, guitar, keyboards
Sanjay Kumar – keyboards
Bob Drake – vocals, bass guitar, guitar, violin, recording engineer
with:
Thomas Dimuzio – electronics
Susanne Lewis – vocals
James Grigsby – guitar, vibes, bass
Michelle Bos – utensils, penny fountain, skydiving ocarinas, metal tables, creaks, blue rocks

References

External links

Hunger's Teeth details of each song at defunct www.5uus.com (archived copy)

1994 albums
5uu's albums
Recommended Records albums